The Shore Club is a restaurant and live music venue located in Hubbards, Nova Scotia. Built by Roy Harnish in 1946, it has become locally renowned for serving a lobster supper. Now in the third generation of owners, Shore Club bids itself as the "Original Nova Scotian Lobster Supper" and also the "Last of the Great Dance Halls" built after the Second World War. Notable musical acts that have performed at the Shore Club include Joel Plaskett, Matt Mays, Wintersleep and Classified.

History
Roy Harnish started building the Shore Club in May 1946, with the first supper and dance taking place only three months later on August 25. Roy and wife, Lois, were active operators of the club until 1985.

Today, Rhys Harnish, a third generation Harnish (with son Luke close behind), continues the legacy started by his father, Roy, in 1946, that of running the restaurant. To date well over one million lobsters have been served.

While the Shore Club dates back more than 60 years, its history runs even deeper. Its first lobster supper was cooked in a cooper cook pot from the USS Chesapeake.
On June 1, 1813, HMS Shannon had entered Boston Harbor and in a battle lasting less than 15 minutes had captured the Chesapeake. The Chesapeake was towed into Halifax Harbour where its chattels were auctioned. Its large copper cook pot eventually ended in the possession of Guy Harnish (Roy's father).

On August 5, 1936 Guy, who had been approached by The Gyro International Club to host their national convention, catered the first "Lobster Supper" on Hubbards Beach. The old Chesapeake pot was shined up and cooked its first meal in over 120 years. The lobster supper was a great success, and soon more groups came to eat lobster on Hubbards Beach. Today the old cook pot can be seen at Maritime Museum of the Atlantic.

See also
 List of supper clubs

External links
 

Buildings and structures in Halifax, Nova Scotia
Music venues in Halifax, Nova Scotia
Supper clubs